Egyptian National Police or ENP is a department of the Ministry of Interior of Egypt.

National organization

The Ministry of Interior divides the functions of the police and public security among four Deputy Ministers of Interior while the Minister of Interior himself retained responsibility for state security (Qitaa' al-amn al-watani), investigations and overall organization.

There are four Deputy Ministers:
 Public Security responsible for public safety (inc. Municipal Police), travel, Immigration, passports, port security, and criminal investigation.
 Special Police responsible for prison administration, the Central Security Forces, civil defense, police transport, police communications, traffic police, and Tourism and Antiquities Police.
 Personnel Affairs was responsible for police-training institutions, personnel matters for police and civilian employees, and the Policemen's Sports Association.
 Administrative and Financial Affairs responsible for general administration, budgets, supplies, and legal matters.

Regional organization
In each of the 27 Governorates of Egypt (sing. muhafazah; pl., muhafazat), the presidentially appointed governor and a director of police command all police and maintain public order. Both the governor and the director of police report to the Ministry of Interior on all security matters. The governor reports directly to the minister or to a deputy while the director of police reports through regular police channels. In the governorate's subdivisions there are district police commandants with the authority and functions that were similar to the director at the governorate level.

The urban police have more modern facilities and equipment, such as computers and communications equipment, while the smaller more remote village police have less sophisticated facilities and equipment. The police became increasingly motorized and it is now rare to see an officer on foot patrol except in city or town centers, and then rarely alone. An increasing number of urban centers police bicycle units are used to provide a quick response in congested areas, pedestrianized areas and parkland, as well as carrying out patrols.

Training
All of the commissioned officers were graduates of the Police Academy at Cairo where after high school, they had to complete four years at the academy, or after College degree, completing a period of 12 to 18 months. The Police Academy is a modern institution equipped with laboratory and physical-training facilities. The police force also sent some officers abroad for schooling.

The Police Academy offers a four-year program which includes: security administration, criminal investigation, military drills, civil defense, fire fighting, forensic medicine, communications, cryptology, first aid, sociology, anatomy, and foreign languages (French and English). Also included are: political orientation, public relations, and military subjects (such as infantry and cavalry training), marksmanship, leadership, and field exercises. Graduates receive a bachelor of police studies degree and are commissioned lieutenants, while those who held degrees from other colleges are commissioned as first lieutenants.

Advanced officer training was given at the academy's Institute for Advanced Police Studies, completion of which was required for advancement beyond the rank of lieutenant colonel. The academy's three-month course for enlisted personnel is conducted in a military atmosphere but emphasizes police methods and techniques.

Some police officers, especially the special operations officers, are well trained by the Egyptian Armed Forces in Al-Sa'ka Military School.

Uniforms and equipment

Ranks
Egyptian police rank insignia are the same as those used by the Egyptian Army. Commissioned police ranks resemble those of the Egyptian Army. The highest-ranking Egyptian police officer is a Lieutenant General and officer ranks descend only to first lieutenant. Enlisted police ranks include master sergeant, sergeant, corporal, and private.

Officers' ranks

Police uniforms
Egyptian police uniforms are similar to the Egyptian Army's service uniform for the ground forces, which is khaki drill cotton. However, enlisted police personnel wear a black wool bush jacket and trousers in the winter and a white cotton bush jacket and trousers in the summer. Certain police personnel also wear a blue or black beret.

Equipment
Egyptian law enforcement police officers generally carry either the M&P357, CZ 75B or Glock pistol when on regular duty, however, heavy arms are always available at police stations. These include submachine guns, assault rifles, shotguns and carbines, while special units may also have additional weapons like Flash bang and stinger tear gas grenades, H&K USP series and SIG Sauer series pistols, Heckler & Koch MP5, Heckler & Koch UMP and FN P90 submachine guns, M14 rifle, the Remington 700P and some .50 caliber sniper rifles.

The Tourism and Antiquities Police cover tourist destinations like historical sites, museums, hotels, etc. Places such as the Great Pyramid of Giza, Memphis Giza, Egyptian Museum, etc. in Cairo, Alexandria – Qaitbay Citadel and the Serapium Temple and Pompey's Pillar, etc., going through all cities in Egypt carrying same weapons as law enforcement police.

Transport

Unlike in many other countries, the Egyptian police extensively use SUVs. The Egyptian produced Jeep vehicle used to be the most common police car in Egypt but in recent years, other similar vehicles have also come into police use. SUVs are known for their capabilities to move around in any sort of terrain. Depending upon the location, the police vehicles may have individual revolving lights (strobe lights) or light bars, sirens etc. An extensive modernisation drive has ensured that these vehicles are equipped with wireless sets in communication with a central control room. Traffic Police vehicles generally also have equipment like speed radars, breath analysers and emergency first aid kits. Color schemes of police vehicles vary according to their location and which directorate they belong to.

For traffic regulation and patrolling in cities, motorcycles are also used. This is because of increasing congestion in cities where the heavier bikes would prove to be unwieldy when compared to the nimbler handling the newer bikes were capable of. The bikes are provided with two-way radios, strobes and sirens and are generally painted white. Some cities make use of sedans as patrol vehicles or high speed 'interceptors' on highways. Of late, the various police forces are on a modernisation drive, upgrading and revamping their fleet with new vehicles.

Relations with public

The police in Egypt lost some prestige during the 2011 Revolution. According to one source (csmonitor.org), the Egyptian police, "once feared by civilians, are now seen as leftover elements of Mubarak's regime and treated with little respect. Pulled off the streets after violently cracking down on protests in January, they are now trying to reshape their role in the post-Mubarak Egypt." Police brutality is credited with being one of the causes of the revolution, and as of June 2011 several police officers are being tried for the killing of "hundreds of demonstrators" during the revolution. According to government statistics, 90 police stations have been burnt since the start of the revolution. The government has taken steps to address public concerns and police demoralization.
In response to a planned July 8 rally protesting the release on bail of police accused of murdering protesters during the revolution, interim interior minister Mansour el-Essawy promised to purge up to 700 corrupt senior police officers. However protesters complained that five months after the revolution where almost 1000 people were killed, only one officer has been convicted of wrongdoing and he has not yet been incarcerated.

July 2013 coup d'état

Mass demonstrations took place for and against President Mohamed Morsi on 30 June 2013, marking the one-year anniversary of Mohamed Morsi's inauguration. The police, along with the military, had made it clear that they were with anti-government protestors by carrying out a coup d'état on 3 July.

Sit-in dispersals

The August 2013 Rabaa massacre by police to remove pro-government protesters from sit-ins being held in Rabaa Al-Adawiya and Al-Nahda Square in support of President Mohamed Morsi resulted in rapidly escalating violence that eventually led to the death of over 900 people, with at least 3,994 injured. The police attempted to defend their actions by claiming to disperse the sit-ins with the least possible damage.

Treatment of women

According to writer Ahdaf Soueif, since 2005 the police have routinely grabbed women protesters and torn "their clothes off and beat them, groping them at the same time. The idea was to insinuate that females who took part in street protests wanted to be groped." To protect against this, many female protesters wear "layers of light clothing, no buttons, drawstring pants double-knotted".

Gallery

See also 
Central Security Forces
Crime in Egypt
Death of Khaled Mohamed Saeed
Egyptian General Intelligence Directorate
Battle of Ismailia (1952)
National Police Day (Egypt)
Terrorism in Egypt
The General Directorate for State Security Investigations
Hostage Rescue Force

References

Sources
 World Police Encyclopedia, ed. by Dilip K. Das and Michael Palmiotto published by Taylor & Francis, 2004.
 World Encyclopedia of Police Forces and Correctional Systems, second edition, 2006 by Gale.
 Sullivan, Larry E. Encyclopedia of Law Enforcement. Thousand Oaks: Sage Publications, 2005.
LOC Egypt County Study page

External links
 MOI official website (Arabic)
 MOI official website (English)
 From Bad Cop to Good Cop: The Challenge of Security Sector Reform in Egypt The Brookings Institution, by Omar Ashour 19 November 2012.

Official sites in English:
 Public Security
 Tourism
 Immigration
 Narcotics
 Prisons
 Mubarak police Academy
 Fraud
 Traffic

Law enforcement agencies of Egypt